Hau-Li Fan (born September 8, 1997) is a Canadian competitive swimmer who specializes in the open water swimming events.

Career 
In 2019, Fan finished in seventeenth position in the 10 km event at the 2019 World Aquatics Championships.

At the 2020 Olympic Marathon Swim Qualifier in Setúbal, Portugal, Fan qualified for the 2020 Summer Olympics as the highest finisher from the Americas not yet qualified. Competing in Tokyo, Fan finished ninth in the 10 km marathon.

References

External links
 
 

1997 births
Living people
Canadian male long-distance swimmers
Swimmers from Vancouver
Swimmers at the 2020 Summer Olympics
Olympic swimmers of Canada